Palmira is a corregimiento in Santa Isabel District, Colón Province, Panama with a population of 319 as of 2010. Its population as of 1990 was 313; its population as of 2000 was 458.

References

Corregimientos of Colón Province
Road-inaccessible communities of Panama